Mabel Van Buren (born Mabel Brown Southard; July 17, 1878 – November 4, 1947) was an American stage and screen actress.

Biography

As a theatrical performer she played the leading lady in both The Virginian and The Squaw Man (1909). Van Buren became prominent in motion pictures at the time of the development of feature-length movies in 1914. She starred in The Girl of the Golden West (1915) under the direction of Cecil B. Demille. It was Demille who brought Mabel west to Hollywood. Mabel was the first leading lady of the Famous Players-Lasky studio on Vine Street in Hollywood, California.

Her final role of note was in Neighbor's Wives (1933) in which she played Mrs. Lee. She continued  acting in movies until the death of her husband, James Gordon. He was a Shakesperian actor who died in 1941. Other films in which she played prominent parts are The Warrens of Virginia (1915), The Man From Home (1914), and Craig's Wife (1928).

Van Buren's residence was 4351 Kingswell Avenue, Los Angeles, California. She died of pneumonia in 1947, age 69, at St. Vincent's Hospital. Her daughter, Katherine Charlton, was also an actress.

Partial filmography

 The House with Closed Shutters (1910, Short) - On Porch / At Farewell
 Brewster's Millions (1914) - Mrs. Gray
 The Dishonored Medal (1914) - Anitra
 The Master Mind (1914) - Lucine, Three-Arm Fanny
 The Man on the Box (1914) - Kit Warburton
 The Man from Home (1914) - Ethel Granger Simpson
 The Circus Man (1914) - Mary Braddock
 The Ghost Breaker (1914) - Delores
 The Girl of the Golden West (1915) - The Girl
 The Warrens of Virginia (1915) - Mrs. Warren
 The Woman (1915) - Grace Robertson
 Should a Wife Forgive? (1915) - Mary Holmes
 The Sowers (1916) - Princess Tanya
 Ramona (1916) - Ramona (in the prologue)
 The House with the Golden Windows (1916) - Mrs. Peabody
 The Victoria Cross (1916) - Princess Adala
 Lost and Won (1917) - Minor Role
 Those Without Sin (1917) - Estelle Wallace
 A School for Husbands (1917) - Mrs. Airlie
 The Silent Partner (1917) - Edith Preston
 Unconquered (1917) - Mrs. Lenning
 The Jaguar's Claws (1917) - Marie
 The Squaw Man's Son (1917) - Lady Stuckley
 Hashimura Togo (1917) - Mrs. Reynolds
 The Countess Charming (1917) - Mrs. Vandergraft
 The Devil-Stone (1917) - Mrs. Rogers
 The Winding Trail (1918) - Lou
 Breakers Ahead (1918) - Aunt Agatha Pixley
 Riders of the Night (1918) - Sally's Aunt
 Hearts of Men (1919) - Tina Ferronni
 Young Mrs. Winthrop (1920) - Mrs. Dunbar
 The Sins of Rosanne (1920) - Mrs. Ozanne
 Conrad in Quest of His Youth (1920) - Nina
 The Four Horsemen of the Apocalypse (1921) - Elena
 A Wise Fool (1921) - Madame Langlois
 Moonlight and Honeysuckle (1921) - Mrs. Langley
 Miss Lulu Bett (1921) - Ina Deacon
 Beyond the Rocks (1922) - Jane McBride
 For the Defense (1922) - Cousin Selma
 The Woman Who Walked Alone (1922) - Hannah Schriemann
 While Satan Sleeps (1922) - Sunflower Sadie
 Manslaughter (1922) - Prisoner
 Youth to Youth (1922) - Mrs. Brookins
 Pawned (1922) - Mrs. Veniza
 Fighting Blood (1923) - Mrs. Wilcox - Judy's Mother
 Wandering Daughters (1923) - Annie Bowden
 The Light That Failed (1923) - Madame Binat
 Lights Out (1923) - Mrs. Gallant
 In Search of a Thrill (1923) - Lila Lavender
 The Dawn of a Tomorrow (1924) - Bet
 The Top of the World (1925) - Mary Ann
 Smooth as Satin (1925) - Mrs. Munson
 His Secretary (1925) - Mrs. Sloden
 The King of Kings (1927) - (uncredited)
 The Meddlin' Stranger (1927) - Mrs. Crawford
 Craig's Wife (1928) - Mrs. Frazer
 The Flyin' Buckaroo (1928) - Mrs. Brown
 His First Command (1929) - Mrs. Sargent
 Neighbors' Wives (1933) - Mrs. Lee
 Mississippi (1935) - Party Guest (uncredited) (final film role)

References

Lincoln, Nebraska Daily Star, Answers To Movie Fans, September 30, 1917, Page 30.
Los Angeles Times, Lasky Lot, In Ruins, Recall Early Film History, June 6, 1926, Page B10.
Los Angeles Times, Original Girl of the Golden West, 69, DiesNovember 6, 1947, Page 2.
The New York Times, Mabel Van Buren, November 6, 1947, Page 27.
Washington Post, Notes About Plays And Players, October 24, 1909, Page 94.

External links

Catherine Van Buren, Mabel's daughter (University of Washington, Sayre collection)

American film actresses
American stage actresses
American silent film actresses
Actresses from Chicago
1878 births
1947 deaths
Deaths from pneumonia in California
20th-century American actresses